= Haystack Hills =

Coordinates: 43°37′27″N 89°51′42″W

Haystack Hills is a range in the U.S. state of Wisconsin. The elevation is 1,171 feet (357 m).

Haystack Hills was descriptively named on account of its shape.
